6/3 may refer to:
June 3 (month-day date notation)
March 6 (day-month date notation)